The 2020 WNBA season was the 24th season of the Women's National Basketball Association (WNBA). The Washington Mystics were the defending champions. Planned changes to the league's schedule included an increase from 34 to 36 regular season games for each team, the introduction of a mid-season Commissioner's Cup tournament, and more games broadcast on ESPN and ABC. This was the first season under a new Collective Bargaining Agreement between the league and the WNBA Players Association. However, on April 3, the season was indefinitely postponed due to the COVID-19 pandemic. Under a plan approved on June 15, the league began a shortened 22-game regular season at IMG Academy in Bradenton, Florida, without fans present on July 25. A'ja Wilson of the Las Vegas Aces was named the league MVP. The Seattle Storm won the 2020 WNBA Finals over the Aces, and Breanna Stewart was named the Finals MVP.

Offseason

Collective Bargaining Agreement 
On January 14, 2020, the WNBA and the WNBA Players Association announced that a new eight-year Collective Bargaining Agreement (CBA) had been signed. Key provisions of the new CBA include:

 The new maximum base salary, for which certain qualified players and those designated as "core players" are eligible, is $215,000, an increase from $117,500 under the previous CBA. Maximum earnings for top players can be over $500,000.
 The new minimum base salary for inexperienced players is $57,000 and for experienced players is $68,000. This is an increase from $41,965 and $56,375 respectively under the previous CBA.
 The "core player" designation, under which teams can retain players otherwise eligible for free agency, remains available to teams. However, while teams could designate a player as such up to four times under the previous CBA, this has been reduced to thrice in the next two seasons and twice thereafter.
 Apart from those players under the "core player" designation, all players who have met contract obligations for five years become unrestricted free agents. This is a decrease from the required six years under the previous CBA.
 The league will enter a 50-50 revenue sharing agreement beginning in 2021, conditional on meeting certain revenue growth targets.
 For road games, players will receive "comfort/economy plus" seats rather than ordinary economy class seats, and will receive individual hotel rooms.
 The league will provide a new paid maternity leave policy, where players will receive their full salaries while on leave. Players with children will be provided an annual $5,000 childcare stipend and two-bedroom apartments. Veteran players are also eligible for up to $60,000 in reimbursements for costs related to family planning.
 The league will institute a new “Diversity in Coaching” initiative to build a pipeline to coaching and offer other paid employment opportunities for players during the offseason. Under the initiative, WNBA players can work on coaching staffs or in front offices of NBA teams without a salary limit, regardless of the WNBA team's ownership structure.
 The league will create expanded programs to address intimate partner violence and nutrition, but details about these programs were not included in the CBA.
 By the sixth year of the CBA, veteran players (defined for this purpose as those with more than 2 years of WNBA experience) will face season-long suspension for missing the start of training camp. The CBA includes several exceptions to this policy, among them serious injury or illness, maternity leave, national team commitments for non-US players, college graduations, and other significant life events.

Schedule changes 

The WNBA originally planned that each team would play 36 total games in the 2020 season, an increase from the 34 games played in each season since 2003. Teams were to have 18 home and road games each.

The original 2020 season schedule featured the inaugural Commissioner's Cup, an in-season tournament. In the first half of the season between May 15 and July 10, each team would have played its first home and road games against its five conference opponents. These games would have been designated as "Cup games", and the leaders in Cup standings in each conference were would have met in the Commissioner's Cup championship game scheduled for August 14, 2020.

The 2020 WNBA schedule originally included a traditional month-long break in July and August to allow players to participate in the Summer Olympic Games. The 2020 games were, however, postponed till 2021 due to the COVID-19 pandemic, rendering this break unnecessary.

Postponement due to the COVID-19 pandemic 

As with most professional sports leagues, the WNBA season was affected by the COVID-19 pandemic. On April 3, 2020, the WNBA announced that the start of its schedule would also be postponed. The 2020 entry draft took place as originally scheduled on April 17, although it was done remotely. On the originally scheduled opening day, May 15, 2020, Engelbert told ESPN that the players would get their first paychecks on June 1. On June 4, ESPN reported that the WNBA was planning on a shortened 22-game regular season to be held at IMG Academy, with players receiving 60% of their salaries. On June 9, The Next reported that many players were unhappy with the reduced salary, and the league revised its plans by June 12 to include full season salaries for players. On June 15, the return-to-play proposal was approved. The playoff format, which included single-elimination first and second-round games and then five-game series for the semifinals and finals, stayed the same and ended in October.

2020 WNBA draft 

The New York Liberty have the first pick in the 2020 WNBA draft.  The Liberty selected Sabrina Ionescu first overall.  The full draft was televised on ESPN in the USA and on both TSN2 and SN1 in Canada.

Transactions

Retirements 
 In June 2019, Camille Little announced her retirement after twelve years of playing in the WNBA.  She won the WNBA Title in 2010 with the Seattle Storm.
 In September 2019, Sancho Lyttle announced her retirement after fourteen years of playing in the WNBA. Lyttle made the WNBA All-Star game once, and twice lead the league in steals.
Alana Beard announced her retirement on January 22, 2020 after fifteen years of playing professionally.  Beard is a four time WNBA All-Star and two time WNBA Defensive Player of the Year.  She also won a WNBA Championship while playing with the Los Angeles Sparks.
Rebekkah Brunson announced her retirement on February 11, 2020 after fifteen years of playing professionally.  Brunson stayed with the Minnesota Lynx as an assistant coach.  Brunson had her jersey number 32 retired by the Lynx. Brunson finished her career as a five time WNBA Champion and five time WNBA All-Star.  As of her retirement, Brunson was the active WNBA leader in rebounds.
Carolyn Swords announced she was retiring to join the marketing team of the Las Vegas Aces on February 24, 2020.  However, due to the COVID-19 pandemic, she was let go from her position and resumed her career to re-join the Aces. Over her nine-year career, she played for four different teams.

Free agency 
Free agency negotiations started on January 28, 2020, and the signing period began on February 10, 2020.

Coaching changes

Arena changes 
 In June 2019, it was announced that the Bankers Life Fieldhouse would undergo renovations to add an outdoor plaza and skating area. The Indiana Fever originally announced that they would play home games at the Hinkle Fieldhouse for the 2020–2022 seasons. However, the entire 2020 WNBA season was moved to Bradenton, Florida, and the Fever split their 2021 season between Bankers Life Fieldhouse and Indiana Farmers Coliseum.
 In July 2019, it was announced that Talking Stick Resort Arena would be undergoing renovations and the Phoenix Mercury would be forced to play their home games at Arizona Veterans Memorial Coliseum for the 2020 season. The entire 2020 WNBA season was moved to Bradenton, Florida, and the Mercury returned to Talking Stick Resort Arena (at the time known as Phoenix Suns Arena) in 2021.
 On October 17, 2019, the New York Liberty announced that they would move to the Barclays Center in Brooklyn as their permanent home. In the 2018 and 2019 seasons, the Liberty's primary home venue was the Westchester County Center in White Plains, New York.
 On October 18, 2019, the Atlanta Dream announced that it would move from State Farm Arena in downtown Atlanta to the new Gateway Center Arena in the southern suburb of College Park, Georgia.

Regular season

All-Star Game 
Traditionally, there is no WNBA All-Star Game during an Olympic year, such as 2020. The 2020 Tokyo games were postponed until 2021 because of the COVID-19 pandemic. With the season being held at IMG Academy, the All-Star Game was not played in 2020.

Standings

Schedule 

|-
| Friday, April 17 || 8:00 p.m. || colspan=3| 2020 WNBA Draft ||colspan=5| USA: ESPNCanada: TSN2, SN1 || Virtually
|-

|-
! style="background:#094480; color:white" | 2020 WNBA regular season
|-

|-
| rowspan=3 | Saturday, July 25
| 12:00 p.m.
| Seattle Storm
| @
| New York Liberty
| USA: ESPNCanada: TSN1/4
| 87–71
| Clarendon (20)
| Stokes (10)
| Bird (5)
| IMG Academy
|-
| 3:00 p.m.
| Los Angeles Sparks
| @
| Phoenix Mercury
| ABC
| 99–76
| N. Ogwumike (21)
| Griner (9)
| Gray (7)
| IMG Academy
|-
| 5:00 p.m.
| Indiana Fever
| @
| Washington Mystics
| CBSSN, NBC Sports Washington
| 76–101
| Hines-Allen (27)
| Hines-Allen (10)
| Mitchell (4)
| IMG Academy
|-
| rowspan=3 | Sunday, July 26
| 12:00 p.m.
| Connecticut Sun
| @
| Minnesota Lynx
| USA: ESPNCanada: SN360
| 69–77
| A. Thomas (20)
| Fowles (18)
| Dantas (5)
| IMG Academy
|-
| 3:00 p.m.
| Chicago Sky
| @
| Las Vegas Aces
| ABC
| 88–86
| McCoughtry (25)
| Wilson (11)
| Vandersloot (11)
| IMG Academy
|-
| 5:00 p.m.
| Dallas Wings
| @
| Atlanta Dream
| CBSSN
| 95–105
| Billings (30)
| Billings (13)
| Carter (8)
| IMG Academy
|-
| rowspan=3 | Tuesday, July 28
| 7:00 p.m.
| Washington Mystics
| @
| Connecticut Sun
| NBA TV, NESN+, NBC Sports Washington
| 94–89
| Bonner (29)
| A. Thomas (11)
| Meesseman (8)
| IMG Academy
|-
| 9:00 p.m.
| Los Angeles Sparks
| @
| Chicago Sky
| NBA TV, WCIU, Spectrum Sportsnet
| 78–96
| Tied (21)
| Tied (9)
| Vandersloot (10)
| IMG Academy
|-
| 10:00 p.m.
| Minnesota Lynx
| @
| Seattle Storm
| CBSSN, JoeTV, Fox Sports North Plus
| 66–90
| Tied (18)
| Fowles (11)
| Loyd (6)
| IMG Academy
|-
| rowspan=3 | Wednesday, July 29
| 7:00 p.m.
| Phoenix Mercury
| @
| Indiana Fever
| NBA TV
| 100–106
| Hartley (26)
| McCowan (13)
| 3 tied (5)
| IMG Academy
|-
| 8:00 p.m.
| New York Liberty
| @
| Dallas Wings
| CBSSN
| 80–93
| Ionescu (33)
| Zahui B. (11)
| Ionescu (7)
| IMG Academy
|-
| 10:00 p.m.
| Atlanta Dream
| @
| Las Vegas Aces
| CBSSN, MYLVTV
| 70–100
| Wilson (21)
| Wilson (11)
| Tied (4)
| IMG Academy
|-
| rowspan=3 | Thursday, July 30
| 6:00 p.m.
| Seattle Storm
| @
| Washington Mystics
| USA: ESPNCanada: SN360
| 71–89
| Atkins (22)
| Stewart (10)
| Mitchell (6)
| IMG Academy
|-
| 8:00 p.m.
| Chicago Sky
| @
| Minnesota Lynx
| NBA TV, Fox Sports North, WCIU
| 81–83
| Collier (20)
| Stevens (11)
| DeShields (5)
| IMG Academy
|-
| 10:00 p.m.
| Connecticut Sun
| @
| Los Angeles Sparks
| ESPN
| 76–81
| Bonner (34)
| A. Thomas (18)
| A. Thomas (8)
| IMG Academy
|-
| rowspan=3 | Friday, July 31
| 7:00 p.m.
| New York Liberty
| @
| Atlanta Dream
| USA: NBA TV, Fox Sports SoutheastCanada: TSN2, NBA TV Canada
| 78–84
| Laney (30)
| Billings (15)
| Clarendon (5)
| IMG Academy
|-
| 8:00 p.m.
| Indiana Fever
| @
| Dallas Wings
| CBSSN
| 73–76
| Sabally (23)
| Sabally (17)
| Allemand (11)
| IMG Academy
|-
| 10:00 p.m.
| Las Vegas Aces
| @
| Phoenix Mercury
| CBSSN, MYLVTV
| 95–102
| Tied (22)
| Turner (9)
| Taurasi (10)
| IMG Academy
|-

|-
| rowspan=3 | Saturday, August 1
| 4:00 p.m.
| Minnesota Lynx
| @
| Connecticut Sun
| USA: NBA TV, NESN, Fox Sports NorthCanada: NBA TV Canada
| 78–69
| Bonner (28)
| Fowles (13)
| Tied (4)
| IMG Academy
|-
| 6:00 p.m.
| Washington Mystics
| @
| Chicago Sky
| USA: NBA TV, WCIU, NBC Sports WashingtonCanada: NBA TV Canada
| 86–88
| Atkins (24)
| Hines-Allen (12)
| Vandersloot (8)
| IMG Academy
|-
| 8:00 p.m.
| Los Angeles Sparks
| @
| Seattle Storm
| CBSSN, JoeTV, Spectrum Sportsnet
| 75–81
| Stewart (21)
| Parker (12)
| Clark (6)
| IMG Academy
|-
| rowspan=3 | Sunday, August 2
| 1:00 p.m.
| Phoenix Mercury
| @
| New York Liberty
| USA: ESPNCanada: TSN4
| 96–67
| Hartley (27)
| Turner (11)
| Taurasi (9)
| IMG Academy
|-
| 3:30 p.m.
| Atlanta Dream
| @
| Indiana Fever
| USA: NBA TV, Fox Sports SouthCanada: NBA TV Canada
| 77–93
| K. Mitchell (23)
| Billings (8)
| Allemand (9)
| IMG Academy
|-
| 6:00 p.m.
| Dallas Wings
| @
| Las Vegas Aces
| USA: ESPN2Canada: NBA TV Canada
| 70–79
| Ogunbowale (20)
| Tied (8)
| Hamby (4)
| IMG Academy
|-
| rowspan=3 | Tuesday, August 4
| 6:00 p.m.
| Dallas Wings
| @
| Chicago Sky
| WCIU, Fox Sports Southwest Plus
| 79–82
| Ogunbowale (26)
| Stevens (10)
| Vandersloot (10)
| IMG Academy
|-
| 7:00 p.m.
| Phoenix Mercury
| @
| Atlanta Dream
| ESPN2
| 81–74
| Carter (26)
| C. Williams (9)
| Taurasi (6)
| IMG Academy
|-
| 9:00 p.m.
| Connecticut Sun
| @
| Seattle Storm
| USA: ESPN2Canada: NBA TV Canada
| 74–87
| Stewart (22)
| A. Thomas (13)
| Canada (6)
| IMG Academy
|-
| rowspan=3 | Wednesday, August 5
| 7:00 p.m.
| Minnesota Lynx
| @
| New York Liberty
| CBSSN, Fox Sports North Plus
| 92–66
| Carleton (25)
| Stokes (8)
| Clarendon (6)
| IMG Academy
|-
| 8:00 p.m.
| Las Vegas Aces
| @
| Washington Mystics
| USA: NBA TV, NBC Sports Washington, MYLVTVCanada: NBA TV Canada
| 83–77
| Meesseman (24)
| Tied (13)
| Mitchell (4)
| IMG Academy
|-
| 10:00 p.m.
| Indiana Fever
| @
| Los Angeles Sparks
| Spectrum Sportsnet
| 75–86
| K. Mitchell (24)
| Ca. Parker (11)
| Tied (5)
| IMG Academy
|-
| rowspan=3 | Thursday, August 6
| 6:00 p.m.
| Seattle Storm
| @
| Atlanta Dream
| ESPN2
| 93–92
| Carter (35)
| C. Williams (10)
| Carter (7)
| IMG Academy
|-
| 8:00 p.m.
| Connecticut Sun
| @
| Dallas Wings
| NBA TV, Fox Sports Southwest Plus, NESN
| 91–68
| Tied (17)
| A. Thomas (10)
| J. Thomas (9)
| IMG Academy
|-
| 10:00 p.m.
| Chicago Sky
| @
| Phoenix Mercury
| USA: ESPN2Canada: TSN5, NBA TV Canada
| 86–96
| Tied (22)
| Griner (8)
| Vandersloot (8)
| IMG Academy
|-
| rowspan=3 | Friday, August 7
| 6:00 p.m.
| Indiana Fever
| @
| Minnesota Lynx
| Fox Sports North Plus
| 80–87
| Brown (26)
| McCowan (12)
| Brown (9)
| IMG Academy
|-
| 7:00 p.m.
| New York Liberty
| @
| Washington Mystics
| USA: ESPN2Canada: TSN2
| 74–66
| Powers (20)
| Zahui B. (14)
| Clarendon (6)
| IMG Academy
|-
| 9:00 p.m.
| Los Angeles Sparks
| @
| Las Vegas Aces
| ESPN2
| 82–86
| Wilson (26)
| Ca. Parker (20)
| McCoughtry (5)
| IMG Academy
|-
| rowspan=3 | Saturday, August 8
| 12:00 p.m.
| Atlanta Dream
| @
| Dallas Wings
| USA: ESPN2Canada: SN1, NBA TV Canada
| 75–85
| Ogunbowale (24)
| Jefferson (10)
| Ogunbowale (6)
| IMG Academy
|-
| 3:00 p.m.
| Phoenix Mercury
| @
| Seattle Storm
| USA: ABCCanada: TSN2
| 68–74
| Tied (20)
| Howard (10)
| Canada (10)
| IMG Academy
|-
| 5:00 p.m.
| Chicago Sky
| @
| Connecticut Sun
| USA: NBA TV, NESN+, WCIUCanada: NBA TV Canada
| 100–93
| Tied (22)
| Copper (7)
| Vandersloot (11)
| IMG Academy
|-
| rowspan=3 | Sunday, August 9
| 3:00 p.m.
| Minnesota Lynx
| @
| Los Angeles Sparks
| ESPN
| 81–97
| Dangerfield (29)
| Ca. Parker (10)
| Ca. Parker (9)
| IMG Academy
|-
| 5:00 p.m.
| Las Vegas Aces
| @
| New York Liberty
| YES
| 78–76
| Wilson (31)
| Stokes (12)
| Clarendon (8)
| IMG Academy
|-
| 7:00 p.m.
| Washington Mystics
| @
| Indiana Fever
| ESPN2
| 84–91
| K. Mitchell (29)
| McCowan (11)
| Tied (5)
| IMG Academy
|-
| rowspan=3 | Monday, August 10
| 6:00 p.m.
| Connecticut Sun
| @
| Atlanta Dream
| Fox Sports Southeast
| 93–82
| A. Thomas (21)
| Bonner (9)
| J. Thomas (7)
| IMG Academy
|-
| 7:00 p.m.
| Phoenix Mercury
| @
| Dallas Wings
| USA: ESPN2Canada: TSN2
| 91–79
| Diggins-Smith (26)
| Griner (13)
| Diggins-Smith (7)
| IMG Academy
|-
| 9:00 p.m.
| Chicago Sky
| @
| Seattle Storm
| USA: ESPN2Canada: TSN2
| 71–89
| Stewart (25)
| Howard (7)
| Vandersloot (9)
| IMG Academy
|-
| rowspan=3 | Tuesday, August 11
| 7:00 p.m.
| Las Vegas Aces
| @
| Indiana Fever
| USA: ESPN2Canada: NBA TV Canada
| 98–79
| Tied (20)
| Wislon (11)
| Allemand (6)
| IMG Academy
|-
| 9:00 p.m.
| Washington Mystics
| @
| Minnesota Lynx
| ESPN2
| 48–68
| Fowles (16)
| Fowles (13)
| Dangerfield (4)
| IMG Academy
|-
| 10:00 p.m.
| New York Liberty
| @
| Los Angeles Sparks
| USA: Spectrum SportsnetCanada: TSN5
| 78–93
| J. Jones (24)
| Zahui B. (10)
| Clarendon (5)
| IMG Academy
|-
| rowspan=3 | Wednesday, August 12
| 7:00 p.m.
| Dallas Wings
| @
| Connecticut Sun
| CBSSN
| 66–70
| Ogunbowale (19)
| Sabally (9)
| Tied (4)
| IMG Academy
|-
| 9:00 p.m.
| Phoenix Mercury
| @
| Chicago Sky
| WCIU, Fox Sports Arizona
| 71–89
| Quigley (20)
| Tied (9)
| Vandersloot (5)
| IMG Academy
|-
| 10:00 p.m.
| Atlanta Dream
| @
| Seattle Storm
| Twitter, JoeTV
| 63–100
| Tied (20)
| Stewart (9)
| Canada(10)
| IMG Academy
|-
| rowspan=3 | Thursday, August 13
| 6:00 p.m.
| Indiana Fever
| @
| New York Liberty
| USA: YES, Fox Sports IndianaCanada: TSN3
| 86–79
| Nurse (21)
| McCowan (13)
| Allemand (5)
| IMG Academy
|-
| 7:00 p.m.
| Los Angeles Sparks
| @
| Washington Mystics
| ESPN
| 81–64
| Atkins (20)
| Meesseman (11)
| Tied (5)
| IMG Academy
|-
| 9:00 p.m.
| Minnesota Lynx
| @
| Las Vegas Aces
| USA: ESPNCanada: TSN3
| 77–87
| Wilson (23)
| Collier (14)
| Tied (7)
| IMG Academy
|-
| rowspan=3 | Friday, August 14
| 7:00 p.m.
| Connecticut Sun
| @
| Chicago Sky
| Twitter, WCIU
| 77–74
| Bonner (19)
| A. Thomas (10)
| A. Thomas (8)
| IMG Academy
|-
| 8:00 p.m.
| Seattle Storm
| @
| Dallas Wings
| USA: NBA TVCanada: NBA TV Canada
| 83–65
| Ogunbowale (22)
| Tied (8)
| Bird (5)
| IMG Academy
|-
| 10:00 p.m.
| Atlanta Dream
| @
| Phoenix Mercury
| Fox Sports Arizona Plus, Fox Sports Southeast
| 80–96
| Hartley (24)
| C. Williams (14)
| Dietrick (7)
| IMG Academy
|-
| rowspan=3 | Saturday, August 15
| 12:00 p.m.
| Washington Mystics
| @
| Las Vegas Aces
| USA: ESPNCanada: SN1
| 73–88
| Atkins (17)
| Meesseman (9)
| Robinson (7)
| IMG Academy
|-
| 2:00 p.m.
| Los Angeles Sparks
| @
| Indiana Fever
| USA: ESPNCanada: NBA TV Canada
| 90–76
| K. Mitchell (25)
| T. Mitchell (8)
| 4 tied (5)
| IMG Academy
|-
| 6:00 p.m.
| New York Liberty
| @
| Minnesota Lynx
| CBSSN, Fox Sports North Plus
| 64–94
| Collier (26)
| Collier (13)
| 2 tied (5)
| IMG Academy
|-
| rowspan=3 | Sunday, August 16
| 1:00 p.m.
| Dallas Wings
| @
| Phoenix Mercury
| ABC
| 95–89
| Ogunbowale (33)
| Taurasi (9)
| Hartley (6)
| IMG Academy
|-
| 3:00 p.m.
| Seattle Storm
| @
| Connecticut Sun
| ABC
| 95–72
| Stewart (19)
| Tied (11)
| A. Thomas (6)
| IMG Academy
|-
| 4:00 p.m.
| Chicago Sky
| @
| Atlanta Dream
| Fox Sports Southeast, WCIU
| 92–67
| Ch. Parker (17)
| Billings (8)
| Colson (6)
| IMG Academy
|-
| rowspan=3 | Tuesday, August 18
| 7:00 p.m.
| Indiana Fever
| @
| Connecticut Sun
| CBSSN
| 62–84
| Bonner (28)
| A. Thomas (11)
| Tied (6)
| IMG Academy
|-
| 9:00 p.m.
| Las Vegas Aces
| @
| Chicago Sky
| ESPN2
| 82–84
| Copper (18)
| Wilson (8)
| Vandersloot (15)
| IMG Academy
|-
| 10:00 p.m.
| New York Liberty
| @
| Seattle Storm
| JoeTV
| 64–105
| Nurse (21)
| Howard (11)
| Bird (7)
| IMG Academy
|-
| rowspan=3 | Wednesday, August 19
| 7:00 p.m.
| Atlanta Dream
| @
| Washington Mystics
| CBSSN, NBC Sports Washington
| 91–98
| Laney (35)
| Billings (12)
| Meesseman (10)
| IMG Academy
|-
| 9:00 p.m.
| Dallas Wings
| @
| Minnesota Lynx
| USA: Facebook, Fox Sports North Plus, Fox Sports Southwest PlusCanada: TSN3/5
| 84–91
| Gray (22)
| Thornton (11)
| Dangerfield (6)
| IMG Academy
|-
| 10:00 p.m.
| Phoenix Mercury
| @
| Los Angeles Sparks
| Twitter, Fox Sports Arizona Plus, Spectrum Sportsnet
| 74–83
| Taurasi (19)
| Ca. Parker (12)
| Hartley (9)
| IMG Academy
|-
| rowspan=3 | Thursday, August 20
| 7:00 p.m.
| Chicago Sky
| @
| New York Liberty
| CBSSN, YES, WCIU
| 101–85
| Stevens (25)
| Stokes (9)
| Vandersloot (10)
| IMG Academy
|-
| 8:00 p.m.
| Seattle Storm
| @
| Indiana Fever
| Facebook, Fox Sports Indiana, JoeTV
| 85–90
| Loyd (35)
| McCowan (10)
| Tied (6)
| IMG Academy
|-
| 10:00 p.m.
| Connecticut Sun
| @
| Las Vegas Aces
| CBSSN, NESN+
| 78–99
| McBride (25)
| McCoughtry (8)
| Robinson (9)
| IMG Academy
|-
| rowspan=3 | Friday, August 21
| 7:00 p.m.
| Los Angeles Sparks
| @
| Atlanta Dream
| Twitter, Spectrum Sportsnet
| 93–85 (OT)
| Johnson (23)
| Tied (9)
| Laney (11)
| IMG Academy
|-
| 8:00 p.m.
| Washington Mystics
| @
| Dallas Wings
| USA: Facebook, Fox Sports Southwest Plus, NBC Sports WashingtonCanada: NBA TV Canada
| 92–101 (OT)
| Hines-Allen (35)
| Hines-Allen (12)
| Ogunbowale (9)
| IMG Academy
|-
| 10:00 p.m.
| Minnesota Lynx
| @
| Phoenix Mercury
| CBSSN, Fox Sports North Plus
| 90–80
| Hartley (24)
| Tied (9)
| Tied (6)
| IMG Academy
|-
| rowspan=3 | Saturday, August 22
| 3:00 p.m.
| Seattle Storm
| @
| Las Vegas Aces
| USA: ABCCanada: NBA TV Canada
| 74–82
| Stewart (29)
| Stewart (18)
| Tied (7)
| IMG Academy
|-
| 5:00 p.m.
| Indiana Fever
| @
| Chicago Sky
| CBSSN, WCIU
| 76–87
| Copper (26)
| Ch. Parker (8)
| Vandersloot (9)
| IMG Academy
|-
| 7:00 p.m.
| New York Liberty
| @
| Connecticut Sun
| CBSSN
| 65–82
| A. Thomas (25)
| Bonner (12)
| Bonner (6)
| IMG Academy
|-
| rowspan=3 | Sunday, August 23
| 4:00 p.m.
| Atlanta Dream
| @
| Minnesota Lynx
| Twitter, Fox Sports North Plus, Fox Sports Southeast
| 78–75
| Collier (18)
| Billings (13)
| Laney (10)
| IMG Academy
|-
| 6:00 p.m.
| Dallas Wings
| @
| Los Angeles Sparks
| USA: Facebook, Spectrum Sportsnet, Fox Sports Southwest PlusCanada: SN360
| 81–84
| Sykes (23)
| Ca. Parker (14)
| Ca. Parker (6)
| IMG Academy
|-
| 8:00 p.m.
| Phoenix Mercury
| @
| Washington Mystics
| Facebook, NBC Sports Washington, Fox Sports Arizona
| 88–87
| Taurasi (34)
| Turner (17)
| Hines-Allen (8)
| IMG Academy
|-
| rowspan=3 | Tuesday, August 25
| 7:00 p.m.
| New York Liberty
| @
| Chicago Sky
| CBSSN, WCIU
| 101–99
| Quigley (29)
| Zahui B. (12)
| Vandersloot (9)
| IMG Academy
|-
| 9:00 p.m.
| Las Vegas Aces
| @
| Dallas Wings
| CBSSN, MYLVTV
| 96–92
| Sabally (28)
| Hamby (14)
| Tied (5)
| IMG Academy
|-
| 10:00 p.m.
| Indiana Fever
| @
| Seattle Storm
| USA: ESPN2Canada: NBA TV Canada
| 74–87
| Stewart (27)
| McCowan (11)
| 3 tied (5)
| IMG Academy
|-
| rowspan=3 | Friday, August 28
| 7:00 p.m.
| Minnesota Lynx
| @
| Atlanta Dream
| USA: Facebook, Fox Sports Southeast, Fox Sports North PlusCanada: TSN3
| 88–79
| Dangerfield (23)
| Collier (12)
| 3 Tied (5)
| IMG Academy
|-
| 8:00 p.m.
| Los Angeles Sparks
| @
| Connecticut Sun
| CBSSN
| 80–76
| Gray (27)
| A. Thomas (9)
| Ca. Parker (7)
| IMG Academy
|-
| 10:00 p.m.
| Washington Mystics
| @
| Phoenix Mercury
| CBSSN
| 72–94
| Diggins-Smith (24)
| Turner (7)
| Taurasi (7)
| IMG Academy
|-
| rowspan=3 | Saturday, August 29
| 12:00 p.m.
| New York Liberty
| @
| Las Vegas Aces
| CBSSN, MYLVTV
| 63–80
| Wilson (20)
| Zahui B. (21)
| Robinson (6)
| IMG Academy
|-
| 2:00 p.m.
| Seattle Storm
| @
| Chicago Sky
| USA: ABCCanada: TSN3
| 88–74
| Stewart (21)
| Howard (15)
| Tied (9)
| IMG Academy
|-
| 4:00 p.m.
| Dallas Wings
| @
| Indiana Fever
| CBS
| 82–78
| Ogunbowale (30)
| Sabally (11)
| 3 Tied (4)
| IMG Academy
|-
| rowspan=3 | Sunday, August 30
| 4:00 p.m.
| Connecticut Sun
| @
| Washington Mystics
| Twitter, NBC Sports Washington
| 76-63
| Bonner (20)
| Hinnes-Allen (13)
| A. Thomas (8)
| IMG Academy
|-
| 6:00 p.m.
| Phoenix Mercury
| @
| Minnesota Lynx
| Facebook, Fox Sports North, Fox Sports Arizona Plus
| 83–79
| Diggins-Smith (25)
| Turner (15)
| Tied (5)
| IMG Academy
|-
| 8:00 p.m.
| Atlanta Dream
| @
| Los Angeles Sparks
| Facebook, Spectrum Sportsnet, Fox Sports Southeast
| 79–84
| Carter (26)
| Billings (14)
| Ca. Parker (7)
| IMG Academy
|-
| rowspan=2 | Monday, August 31
| 6:00 p.m.
| Chicago Sky
| @
| Indiana Fever
| CBSSN
| 100–77
| Tied (21)
| Tied (11)
| Vandersloot (18)
| IMG Academy
|-
| 10:00 p.m.
| Los Angeles Sparks
| @
| Minnesota Lynx
| CBSSN, Fox Sports North Plus, Spectrum Sportsnet
| 78–96
| Collier (25)
| Tied (9)
| Carleton (10)
| IMG Academy
|-

|-
| rowspan=3 | Tuesday, September 1
| 7:00 p.m.
| Connecticut Sun
| @
| New York Liberty
| CBSSN, NESN+
| 70–65
| Bonner (27)
| Bonner (12)
| A. Thomas (4)
| IMG Academy
|-
| 8:00 p.m.
| Indiana Fever
| @
| Atlanta Dream
| Facebook, Fox Sports South, Fox Sports Indiana
| 90–102
| Tied (22)
| Achonwa (9)
| Carter (6)
| IMG Academy
|-
| 10:00 p.m.
| Phoenix Mercury
| @
| Las Vegas Aces
| Facebook, MYLVTV, Fox Sports Arizona Plus
| 92–85
| Taurasi (32)
| Tied (13)
| McBride (9)
| IMG Academy
|-
| rowspan=3 | Wednesday, September 2
| 7:00 p.m.
| Minnesota Lynx
| @
| Chicago Sky
| Facebook, WCIU, Fox Sports North Plus
| 86–83
| Dantas (28)
| Ch. Parker (15)
| Vandersloot (12)
| IMG Academy
|-
| 8:00 p.m.
| Los Angeles Sparks
| @
| Dallas Wings
| CBSSN, Spectrum Sportsnet
| 91–83
| Ca. Parker (22)
| Sabally (11)
| Ca. Parker (6)
| IMG Academy
|-
| 10:00 p.m.
| Washington Mystics
| @
| Seattle Storm
| CBSSN, JoeTV, NBC Sports Washington
| 64–71
| Meesseeman (17)
| Stewart (14)
| Tied (5)
| IMG Academy
|-
| rowspan=3 | Thursday, September 3
| 6:30 p.m.
| Atlanta Dream
| @
| New York Liberty
| CBSSN, YES
| 62-56
| C. Williams (15)
| C. Williams (13)
| Zahui B. (4)
| IMG Academy
|-
| 8:00 p.m.
| Las Vegas Aces
| @
| Connecticut Sun
| Twitter, MYLVTV
| 93-78
| Wilson (24)
| Mompremier (16)
| Tied (5)
| IMG Academy
|-
| 10:00 p.m.
| Indiana Fever
| @
| Phoenix Mercury
| Facebook, Fox Sports Indiana
| 81-105
| Diggins-Smith (28)
| Turner (12)
| Diggins-Smith (8)
| IMG Academy
|-
| rowspan=3 | Friday, September 4
| 7:00 p.m.
| Chicago Sky
| @
| Washington Mystics
| Twitter, NBC Sports Washington, WCIU
| 69-79
| Mitchell (20)
| Tied (10)
| Mitchell (12)
| IMG Academy
|-
| 8:00 p.m.
| Minnesota Lynx
| @
| Dallas Wings
| Facebook, Fox Sports Southwest Plus, Fox Sports North Plus
| 88-75
| A. Gray (26)
| Collier (14)
| Tied (5)
| IMG Academy
|-
| 10:00 p.m.
| Seattle Storm
| @
| Los Angeles Sparks
| USA: Facebook, Spectrum Sportsnet, JoeTVCanada: TSN2
| 90-89
| Tied (25)
| Stewart (8)
| Stewart (9)
| IMG Academy
|-
| rowspan=3 | Saturday, September 5
| 4:00 p.m.
| Connecticut Sun
| @
| Indiana Fever
| USA: Facebook, Fox Sports IndianaCanada: SN360
| 96-77
| Bonner (26)
| 5 Tied (6)
| Allemand (8)
| IMG Academy
|-
| 6:00 p.m.
| Las Vegas Aces
| @
| Atlanta Dream
| Facebook, Fox Sports Southeast, MYLVTV
| 89-79
| Tied (21)
| Wilson (8)
| Tied (6)
| IMG Academy
|-
| 8:00 p.m.
| New York Liberty
| @
| Phoenix Mercury
| Twitter
| 67-83
| Diggins-Smith (30)
| Tied (13)
| Turner (4)
| IMG Academy
|-
| rowspan=3 | Sunday, September 6
| 4:00 p.m.
| Dallas Wings
| @
| Washington Mystics
| Twitter, NBC Sports Washington, Fox Sports Southwest Plus
| 101-94 (OT)
| Ogunbowale (39)
| Hines-Allen (10)
| Mitchell (9)
| IMG Academy
|-
| 6:00 p.m.
| Seattle Storm
| @
| Minnesota Lynx
| USA: Facebook, Fox Sports North, JoeTVCanada: NBA TV Canada
| 103-88
| Dantas (22)
| Dantas (9)
| Tied (7)
| IMG Academy
|-
| 8:00 p.m.
| Chicago Sky
| @
| Los Angeles Sparks
| CBSSN, Spectrum Sportsnet, WCIU
| 80-86
| Tied (24)
| Ca. Parker (15)
| Vandersloot (15)
| IMG Academy
|-
| Monday, September 7
| 6:00 p.m.
| Connecticut Sun
| @
| Phoenix Mercury
| CBSSN, NESN
| 85–70
| Bonner (25)
| A. Thomas (9)
| A. Thomas (9)
| IMG Academy
|-
| rowspan=3 | Tuesday, September 8
| 7:00 p.m.
| Los Angeles Sparks
| @
| New York Liberty
| CBSSN, Spectrum Sportsnet
| 96-70
| Tied (20)
| Tied (8)
| Ca. Parker (7)
| IMG Academy
|-
| 8:00 p.m.
| Minnesota Lynx
| @
| Washington Mystics
| ESPN2
| 86-89
| Hines-Allen (26)
| Collier (11)
| Mitchell (10)
| IMG Academy
|-
| 10:00 p.m.
| Indiana Fever
| @
| Las Vegas Aces
| ESPN2
| 86–92
| K. Mitchell (24)
| Wilson (16)
| Allemand (8)
| IMG Academy
|-
| rowspan=3 | Wednesday, September 9
| 7:00 p.m.
| Phoenix Mercury
| @
| Connecticut Sun
| Facebook, Fox Sports Arizona Plus
| 100–95
| Diggins-Smith (33)
| Turner (21)
| 3 tied (5)
| IMG Academy
|-
| 8:00 p.m.
| Atlanta Dream
| @
| Chicago Sky
| CBSSN, WCIU
| 97–89
| Laney (24)
| Vandersloot (11)
| Tied (5)
| IMG Academy
|-
| 10:00 p.m.
| Dallas Wings
| @
| Seattle Storm
| CBSSN, JoeTV
| 95–107
| Sabally (25)
| Stewart (11)
| Bird (9)
| IMG Academy
|-
| rowspan=3 | Thursday, September 10
| 7:00 p.m.
| New York Liberty
| @
| Indiana Fever
| CBSSN
| 75-85
| Dupree (22)
| J. Jones (10)
| Dupree (7)
| IMG Academy
|-
| 8:00 p.m.
| Las Vegas Aces
| @
| Minnesota Lynx
| USA: ESPN2Canada: NBA TV Canada
| 104-89
| Dangerfield (24)
| Tied (11)
| 3 Tied (6)
| IMG Academy
|-
| 10:00 p.m.
| Washington Mystics
| @
| Los Angeles Sparks
| CBSSN, Spectrum Sportsnet, NBC Sports Washington
| 80–72
| Hines-Allen (30)
| Ca. Parker (17)
| Mitchell (9)
| IMG Academy
|-
| rowspan=3 | Friday, September 11
| 7:00 p.m.
| Atlanta Dream
| @
| Connecticut Sun
| Facebook, Fox Sports Southeast
| 82–75
| Carter (22)
| Laney (10)
| 3 tied (4)
| IMG Academy
|-
| 8:00 p.m.
| Chicago Sky
| @
| Dallas Wings
| CBSSN, WCIU
| 95–88
| Ogunbowale (38)
| Hebard (8)
| Vandersloot (12)
| IMG Academy
|-
| 10:00 p.m.
| Seattle Storm
| @
| Phoenix Mercury
| CBSSN, JoeTV
| 83–60
| Walker-Kimbrough (24)
| Turner (11)
| Peddy (6)
| IMG Academy
|-
| rowspan=3 | Saturday, September 12
| 12:00 p.m.
| Washington Mystics
| @
| New York Liberty
| USA: NBA TV, NBC Sports WashingtonCanada: TSN5
| 75–58
| Hines-Allen (25)
| Hines-Allen (11)
| Meesseman (7)
| IMG Academy
|-
| 3:00 p.m.
| Las Vegas Aces
| @
| Los Angeles Sparks
| USA: NBA TV, Spectrum Sportsnet, MYLVTVCanada: NBA TV Canada
| 84–70
| N. Ogwumike (24)
| Ca. Parker (10)
| Gray (11)
| IMG Academy
|-
| 6:00 p.m.
| Minnesota Lynx
| @
| Indiana Fever
| Fox Sports North
| 98–86
| Banham (29)
| McCowan (9)
| Banham (10)
| IMG Academy
|-
| rowspan=3 | Sunday, September 13
| 12:00 p.m.
| Dallas Wings
| @
| New York Liberty
| CBSSN, YES
| 82–79
| Ogunbowale (26)
| Tied (10)
| Nurse (7)
| IMG Academy
|-
| 3:00 p.m.
| Las Vegas Aces
| @
| Seattle Storm
| USA: ABCCanada: TSN2
| 86–84
| Loyd (30)
| Russell (11)
| Hamby (8)
| IMG Academy
|-
| 5:00 p.m.
| Washington Mystics
| @
| Atlanta Dream
| USA: Facebook, Fox Sports SoutheastCanada: SN360
| 85–78
| Laney (27)
| C. Williams (11)
| Meesseman (7)
| IMG Academy
|-

|-
! colspan=2 style="background:#094480; color:white" | 2020 WNBA postseason
|-

|-
| rowspan=2 | Tuesday, September 15
| 7:00 p.m.
| Connecticut Sun
| @
| Chicago Sky
| USA: ESPN2Canada: TSN1/4
| 94–81
| A. Thomas (28)
| A. Thomas (13)
| A. Thomas (8)
| IMG Academy
|-
| 9:00 p.m.
| Washington Mystics
| @
| Phoenix Mercury
| USA: ESPN2Canada: TSN1/4
| 84–85
| Mitchell (25)
| Turner (11)
| Taurasi (6)
| IMG Academy
|-

|-
| rowspan=2 | Thursday, September 17
| 7:00 p.m.
| Phoenix Mercury
| @
| Minnesota Lynx
| USA: ESPN2Canada: TSN5, NBA TV Canada
| 79–80
| Taurasi (28)
| Turner (14)
| Taurasi (9)
| IMG Academy
|-
| 9:00 p.m.
| Connecticut Sun
| @
| Los Angeles Sparks
| USA: ESPN2Canada: SN360
| 73–59
| Ca. Parker (22)
| Ca. Parker (14)
| J. Thomas (6)
| IMG Academy
|-

|-
| Sunday, September 20
| 1:00 p.m.
| Connecticut Sun
| @
| Las Vegas Aces
| USA: ESPNCanada: TSN2
| 87–62
| J. Thomas (31)
| Wilson (9)
| A. Thomas (5)
| IMG Academy
|-
| rowspan=2 | Tuesday, September 22
| 7:00 p.m.
| Connecticut Sun
| @
| Las Vegas Aces
| USA: ESPN2Canada: TSN5
| 75–83
| Wilson (29)
| Mompremier (9)
| Young (5)
| IMG Academy
|-
| 9:00 p.m.
| Minnesota Lynx
| @
| Seattle Storm
| USA: ESPN2Canada: TSN5
| 86–88
| Tied (25)
| Stewart (10)
| Bird (8)
| IMG Academy
|-
| rowspan=2 | Thursday, September 24
| 7:30 p.m.
| Minnesota Lynx
| @
| Seattle Storm
| USA: ESPN2Canada: TSN2
| 79–89
| Dantas (23)
| Stewart (8)
| Tied (7)
| IMG Academy
|-
| 9:30 p.m.
| Las Vegas Aces
| @
| Connecticut Sun
| USA: ESPN2Canada: SN360
| 68–77
| A. Thomas (23)
| Tied (12)
| Young (7)
| IMG Academy
|-
| rowspan=2 | Sunday, September 27
| 1:00 p.m.
| Las Vegas Aces
| @
| Connecticut Sun
| USA: ESPNCanada: TSN2
| 84–75
| McCoughtry (29)
| Bonner (15)
| Tied (6)
| IMG Academy
|-
| 3:00 p.m.
| Seattle Storm
| @
| Minnesota Lynx
| USA: ABCCanada: TSN2
| 92–71
| Stewart (31)
| Collier (15)
| Bird (9)
| IMG Academy
|-
| Tuesday, September 29
| 7:30 p.m.
| Connecticut Sun
| @
| Las Vegas Aces
| USA: ESPN2Canada: TSN1/4/5
| 63–66
| Wilson (23)
| Jones (12)
| Bonner (6)
| IMG Academy
|-

|-
| Friday, October 2
| 7:00 p.m.
| Seattle Storm
| vs.
| Las Vegas Aces
| USA: ESPN2Canada: TSN1/4/5
| 93–80
| Stewart (37)
| Stewart (15)
| Bird (16)
| IMG Academy
|-
| Sunday, October 4
| 3:00 p.m.
| Seattle Storm
| vs.
| Las Vegas Aces
| USA: ABCCanada: SN
| 104–91
| Stewart (22)
| Tied (8)
| Tied (10)
| IMG Academy
|-
| Tuesday, October 6
| 7:00 p.m.
| Las Vegas Aces
| vs.
| Seattle Storm
| USA: ESPNCanada: TSN3/5
| 59–92
| Stewart (26)
| Swords (10)
| Bird (7)
| IMG Academy
|-

Statistical leaders 
The following shows the leaders in each statistical category during the 2020 regular season.

Playoffs

The WNBA continued its current playoff format for 2020. The top eight teams, regardless of conference, make the playoffs, with the top two teams receiving a bye to the semi-finals. The remaining six teams play in two single-elimination playoff rounds, with the third and fourth seeds receiving a bye to the second round.

Season award winners

Player of the Week Award

Player of the Month Award

Rookie of the Month Award

Coach of the Month Award

Postseason awards

Coaches

Eastern Conference

Western Conference 

Notes:
 Year with team does not include 2020 season.
 Records are from time at current team and are through the end of the 2019 season.
 Playoff appearances are from time at current team only.
 WNBA Finals and Championships do not include time with other teams.
 Coaches shown are the coaches who began the 2020 season as head coach of each team.

Activism

In response to the shooting of Jacob Blake in Kenosha, Wisconsin, the Milwaukee Bucks boycotted Game 5 of their series against the Orlando Magic on August 26. Later that day, the NBA announced that in light of the Bucks' decision, all games for the day were postponed. The WNBA joined the protest and postponed their three games that were originally scheduled on Wednesday: Washington Mystics vs. Atlanta Dream; Los Angeles Sparks vs. Minnesota Lynx; Connecticut Sun vs. Phoenix Mercury. Games were again postponed on August 27th.  Games resumed on Friday, August 28.

See also
Impact of the COVID-19 pandemic on basketball

Footnotes

References 

 
2020 in sports in Florida
Women's National Basketball Association seasons
WNBA